Aichach (Central Bavarian: Oacha) is a town in Germany, located in the Bundesland of Bavaria and situated just northeast of Augsburg. It is the capital of the district of Aichach-Friedberg. The municipality of Aichach counts some 20,000 inhabitants. It is not far from the motorway that connects Munich and Stuttgart, the A8. The local river is called Paar. A prison for women Bavaria was established in Aichach in 1909. In 1967 Ilse Koch is was known as The Witch of Buchenwald committed suicide here .

History
Aichach's history dates back nearly 1000 years.

Mayor
Since 1996: Klaus Habermann (* 1953) (SPD)

Twin towns – sister cities

Aichach is twinned with:
 Brixlegg, Austria
 Gödöllő, Hungary
 Schifferstadt, Germany

Notable people

 Erhard Bühler (born 1956), major general
 Christoph Burkhard (born 1984), footballer
 Johannes Engel (1453–1512), doctor, astronomer and astrologer
 Matthias Greitter (1495–1550), cantor and composer
 Chrislo Haas (1956–2004), musician
 Vincenz Müller (1894–1961), officer of Reichswehr, Wehrmacht and NVA

References

External links

Aichach-Friedberg